Dave Kaptain is an American chemist and politician who is the current mayor of Elgin, Illinois.  Kaptain won the April 2011 election by receiving 54.35% of the mayoral votes, defeating incumbent Ed Schock.

Kaptain graduated from School District U-46 schools and received a bachelor's degree from Bradley University in Peoria, Illinois.  He worked for 32 years for the Fox River Water Reclamation District, including as a chief chemist, before retiring from there. He was also the Elgin Community Network's executive director.

He was on the Elgin city council from 2005 until becoming mayor.  After winning the election for mayor, Kaptain said that part of his approach would be to visit the homes of community members in Elgin to confer with them about city governance matters and to encourage higher voter turnout.

References

1940s births
Living people
Bradley University alumni
Mayors of Elgin, Illinois
21st-century American politicians